[[File:Europæere i Kanton (1731).jpg|thumb|Clay figures created in Canton of crew members of Kronprins Christian in 1831: Peter van Gurk is number two from the left.]]

Peter van Hurk (1697 – 16 October 1775) was a Dutch-Danish merchant.

Biography
Peter van Hurk was born in the Netherlands. Due to his experience with trade with China, he was called to Denmark by Fabritius & Wewer to serve as 1st Supercargo on board the ship Kronprins Christian on its first journey to China. The expedition was a great success and he was subsequently a co-founder of the Danish Asiatic Company where he was a partner in 1732–45 and director in 1745–54. Together with Reinhard Iselin, he was in opposition to the transformation of the company and the liberalization of Danish trade on East Asia. Together with five other participants, he filed a lawsuit but lost.

Peter van Hurk was also involved in the establishment of Kurantbanken and served as commissioner of banking in 1739–74. He took over the Royal Danish Silk Manufactury in Copenhagen in 1753.

Personal life
He was the owner of the property Sneglebakken in Kongens Lyngby in 1734–60. In 1768, he acquired Rustenborg from Jean Henri Desmercières.

On 15 January 1744 in the German Reformed Church in Copenhagen, he married Maria Barbara Fabritius. She was the sister of Just and Michael Fabritius.

He was appointed Kommerceråd in 1733, Agent with rank of justitsråd in 1749 and Etatsråd'' in 1753.

References

External links
 Peter van Hurk at Geni Genealogy Directory

1697 births
1775 deaths
18th-century Danish businesspeople
18th-century merchants
Danish Asiatic Company people
Danish businesspeople in shipping
Danish textile industry businesspeople
Danish merchants
Dutch emigrants to Denmark